Mullacor at , is an Irish mountain.

Features 

Mullacor is the 141st–highest peak in Ireland on the Arderin scale, and the 172nd–highest peak on the Vandeleur-Lynam scale.  It's situated in the southern sector of the Wicklow Mountains range, and forms a broad horseshoe around the Upper Lake of the Glendalough valley with the mountains of Lugduff , Conavalla , the hydroelectric station at Turlough Hill , and Camaderry . Mullacor's western flank forms the step sides of the neighbouring Glenmalure valley.  To the east of Mullacor is Cullentragh Mountain .

Mullacor's prominence of  does not qualify it as a Marilyn, but it does rank it as the 90th-highest mountain in Ireland on the MountainViews Online Database, 100 Highest Irish Mountains, where the minimum prominence threshold is 100 metres.

Bibliography

See also
Wicklow Way
Wicklow Mountains
Lists of mountains in Ireland
List of mountains of the British Isles by height
List of Hewitt mountains in England, Wales and Ireland

References

External links

MountainViews: The Irish Mountain Website, Mullacor
MountainViews: Irish Online Mountain Database
The Database of British and Irish Hills , the largest database of British Isles mountains ("DoBIH")
Hill Bagging UK & Ireland, the searchable interface for the DoBIH

Mountains and hills of County Wicklow
Hewitts of Ireland
Mountains under 1000 metres